Jozef Pribilinec (born 6 July 1960) is a Slovak track and field  athlete who mainly competed in racewalking. He was born in Kopernica. Pribilinec competed for the former Czechoslovakia at the 1988 Summer Olympics held in Seoul, South Korea where he won the gold medal in the men's 20 kilometre walk event.

He represented Czechoslovakia for most of his career and in addition to his Olympic gold, won two silver medals at the World Championships in Athletics (1983 and 1987) and one gold and one silver at the European Athletics Championships for his country. He was a two-time champion at the European Athletics Indoor Championships, winning in 1987 and 1988 over distances of 3000 m and 5000 m, respectively. He was a four-time participant at the IAAF World Race Walking Cup and his best performance was a win over 20 km at the 1983 IAAF World Race Walking Cup, becoming his country's first victor at the competition. He had previously shown his developing talent as a youngster with a win at the 1979 European Athletics Junior Championships.

His personal best time of 1:19:30 hours for the 20 km race was a world record from 24 September 1983 to 3 May 1987. This continued a tradition of Czechoslovak record holders, following in the steps of Václav Balšán and Josef Doležal.

Before retiring, he represented Slovakia at the 1993 World Championships in Athletics, placing 17th in the men's 20 km walk.

Political career
Pribilinec was elected into the House of the People within the Federal Assembly in first free elections of June 1990 as a member of Communist Party of Slovakia (KSS) within the Communist Party of Czechoslovakia (KSČ). He was elected as a deputy for :sk:Stredoslovenský kraj. He resigned shortly after the election. In 1994, Pribilinec was elected as an MP into National Council running as a candidate on a party list of Common Choice coalition. He was nominated by the reformed post-communist SDĽ party, of which he was not a member, however. Ahead of the next elections, in the summer of 2002, Pribilinec fell out with party leader Pavel Koncoš, departed from the party caucus and did not stand for re-election.Concerning his Communist Party membership, Pribilinec said that he entered the party, aged 22, out of conviction, believing in declared values.

In 2022, Pribilinec ran unsuccessfuly for a post of a regional deputy of Banská Bystrica Region as a candidate of minor extra-parliamentary national party Heart within the Žiar nad Hronom District precinct, with sport, tourism and service sector development, as his main agenda. Of 21 candidates, with 4 elected deputies, Pribilinec came 16th with 954 votes (2%). In the build-up to the elections, he advocated in support of Slovalco aluminium plant in Žiar nad Hronom, in a campaign seeking financial support for rising energy costs.

References

External links 
 
 
 
 

1960 births
Living people
People from Žiar nad Hronom District
Sportspeople from the Banská Bystrica Region
Slovak male racewalkers
Slovak politicians
Czechoslovak male racewalkers
Olympic gold medalists for Czechoslovakia
Athletes (track and field) at the 1980 Summer Olympics
Athletes (track and field) at the 1988 Summer Olympics
Olympic athletes of Czechoslovakia
World record setters in athletics (track and field)
World Athletics Championships medalists
European Athletics Championships medalists
World Athletics Championships athletes for Czechoslovakia
World Athletics Championships athletes for Slovakia
Medalists at the 1988 Summer Olympics
Olympic gold medalists in athletics (track and field)
World Athletics Race Walking Team Championships winners
World Athletics Indoor Championships medalists
Members of the National Council (Slovakia) 1992-1994
Party of the Democratic Left (Slovakia) politicians
Communist Party of Slovakia (1939) politicians
Slovak communists